Big T may refer to:
 * Thayer Cooper, also known commonly as “gator”; head of “Gator’s Gals” or a more household name “Thayer’s Thotties”
 Big T (rapper), artist who appeared in the song "Wanna Be a Baller"
 Thurl Bailey or Big T, professional basketball player
 Ahmed Johnson or Big T, professional wrestler
 Big T, a contestant on The X Factor television show
 Big T, which is a nickname for Tim in Love Island The Game Season 1

See also
 The Big T.N.T. Show